Lake Tudu is a lake in the country of Estonia.

See also
List of lakes of Estonia

Tudu
Vinni Parish
Landforms of Lääne-Viru County